Minjee Lee (born 27 May 1996) is an Australian professional golfer from Perth. She became the number one ranked amateur golfer in February 2014 after winning the Oates Victorian Open, remaining number one until turning professional in September 2014. On 25 July 2021, Lee won her first major championship, the Amundi Evian Championship. On 5 June 2022, she won her second major championship, the U.S. Women's Open.

Amateur career
In 2010, Lee became the youngest winner of the WA Amateur Open while still a year 9 student at Methodist Ladies' College, Perth.  At the start of 2012, she was moved from MLC to Corpus Christi College, to be closer to her golf course at Royal Fremantle.  She left Corpus Christi in 2013.

Lee was the winner of the 2012 U.S. Girls' Junior. She won the Australian Women's Amateur in 2013 and successfully defended the title in 2014.

Lee became the number one ranked amateur golfer on 26 February 2014 after winning the Oates Victorian Open on the ALPG Tour. She remained the number one ranked amateur golfer until she turned professional in September 2014 after leading the Australia team that won the Espirito Santo Trophy.

Professional career

2015
On 18 May 2015, Lee gained her first LPGA Tour victory at the Kingsmill Championship.

2016
In 2016, she won the Lotte Championship in April, and the Blue Bay LPGA in October. Lee represented Australia in the women's golf competition at the 2016 Summer Olympics in Rio de Janeiro, Brazil, finishing in a tie for 7th.

2018
In April 2018, she lost the LPGA Mediheal Championship in a playoff to Lydia Ko, then on 27 May 2018, won the LPGA Volvik Championship. Lee finished 2018 ranked second on the money list with $1,551,032 in earnings, finishing second in scoring average with 69.75 shots per round.  She also became the first woman to win the Greg Norman Medal for being the best Australian professional golfer on the world stage.

2019
On 28 April 2019, Lee won the Hugel-Air Premia LA Open, her fifth LPGA Tour victory.  By late the following month, she had risen to number two in the Women's World Golf Rankings, but in her home country she still had such a low profile that she was described by The Age as the "Invisible Champion of Australia".

2021
On 25 July 2021, Lee won her first major championship, the Amundi Evian Championship, by coming from seven strokes behind in the final round and defeating Lee Jeong-eun on the first playoff hole.

Lee qualified for the Tokyo 2020 Olympics and competed in the women's competition. She scored −4 across the four rounds and finished 29th, out of medal contention.

2022
She won her seventh LPGA Tour event, the Cognizant Founders Cup, on 15 May 2022, beating Lexi Thompson by two strokes, 269 (19-under-par) to Thompson's 271. Her final round of 70 was the only one she did not have in the 60s. The start of the final round was delayed by an hour because of fog. She was ranked fifth in the world before her win, just behind fourth-ranked Atthaya Thitikul who finished the final round with a 63, good for a tie for eighth place at 13-under-par.

Her eighth LPGA Tour win, the U.S. Women's Open on 5 June 2022, earned her the largest payday to date in women's golf history, $1.8 million of the $10 million total purse.  Lee won by four strokes over Mina Harigae, who received $1,080,000. This was the first occasion in a women's golf tournament where there were two prizes in excess of $1 million. Lee set a new record of 271, and led Harigae by three strokes after 54 holes.

On 15 November, she won the season-long Aon Risk Reward Challenge and $1,000,000 for the 2022 LPGA Tour season. This challenge selects one hole in every participating event and designates it as the Aon Risk Reward hole for that week. The challenge rewards the player who has the best two scores from every participating event that a player competes in throughout the season, measured by the lowest average score to par on these holes.

Personal life
Lee's parents, Soonam and Clara Lee, were both from Korea, and emigrated to Australia in the early 1990s. Lee's younger brother, Min Woo Lee, won the 2016 U.S. Junior Amateur, making them the first brother/sister pair to win the USGA's junior championships.

Amateur wins
2010 Western Australia Women's Amateur
2011 Handa Junior Masters, Western Australia Women's Amateur, Singapore Ladies Amateur, Srixon International Junior Classic, Tasmanian Stroke Play Championship
2012 U.S. Girls' Junior, Tasmanian Stroke Play Championship
2013 Australian Women's Amateur, Western Australia Women's Amateur, Rene Erichsen Salver, Australian Girls' Amateur, Dunes Medal
2014 Australian Women's Amateur

Professional wins (11)

LPGA Tour wins (8)

LPGA Tour playoff record (1–2)

Ladies European Tour wins (2)
2018 Oates Victorian Open^
2020 Omega Dubai Moonlight Classic

ALPG Tour wins (2)

^ Co-sanctioned by the ALPG Tour and the Ladies European Tour.

Major championships

Wins (2)

Results timeline
Results not in chronological order before 2019 or in 2020.

LA = Low amateur

CUT = missed the half-way cut
NT = no tournament
"T" = tied

Summary

Most consecutive cuts made – 15 (2019 British – 2022 British, current)
Longest streak of top-10s – 2 (three times)

LPGA Tour career summary

^ Official as of 5 March 2023

World ranking
Position in Women's World Golf Rankings at the end of each calendar year.

^ as of 6 March 2023

Team appearances
Amateur
Espirito Santo Trophy (representing Australia): 2012, 2014 (winners)
Astor Trophy (representing Australia): 2011
Queen Sirikit Cup (representing Australia): 2013 (winners)

Professional
International Crown (representing Australia): 2014 (as an amateur), 2016, 2018

References

External links

Australian female golfers
LPGA Tour golfers
Winners of LPGA major golf championships
Olympic golfers of Australia
Golfers at the 2016 Summer Olympics
Golfers at the 2020 Summer Olympics
Australian people of Korean descent
Golfers from Perth, Western Australia
Sportswomen from Western Australia
1996 births
Living people